Crescent Township may refer to the following places in the United States:

Crescent Township, Iroquois County, Illinois
Crescent Township, Pottawattamie County, Iowa
Crescent Township, Allegheny County, Pennsylvania

See also
La Crescent Township, Houston County, Minnesota

Township name disambiguation pages